Wen, wen, or WEN may refer to:

 WEN, New York Stock Exchange symbol for Wendy's/Arby's Group
 WEN, Amtrak station code for Columbia Station in Wenatchee, Washington, United States
 WEN, ICAO airline designator for WestJet Encore
 Wen (surname) (文, 温, 闻, 问), pinyin romanization of several Chinese surnames
 Wen Jiabao (born 1942), Chinese premier beginning in 2003
 Wen, alternate spelling for Wynn (Ƿ ƿ), a letter of the Old English alphabet
 Wen, common name for trichilemmal cyst or pilar cyst
 Wen, sebaceous cyst, a form of trichilemmal cyst
 Wen, alternate name for lipoma, a benign tumor composed of adipose tissue
 wen, the ISO 639-2 code for the Sorbian languages, also known as Wendish languages

See also 
The Great Wen, a derogatory nickname for London
文 (disambiguation) (Wén)
Wen County (disambiguation)